The World Group was the highest level of Davis Cup competition in 2010. The first round losers went into the Davis Cup World Group Play-offs while the winners progressed to the quarterfinals. The quarterfinalists were guaranteed a World Group spot for 2011.

Participating teams

Draw
The draw for the 2010 World Group was held in Geneva on 23 September 2009.

First round

Spain vs. Switzerland

France vs. Germany

Russia vs. India

Sweden vs. Argentina

Croatia vs. Ecuador

Serbia vs. United States

Chile vs. Israel
Competition was delayed one day due to the 27 February 2010 earthquake.

Belgium vs. Czech Republic

Quarterfinals

France vs. Spain

Russia vs. Argentina

Croatia vs. Serbia

Chile vs. Czech Republic

Semifinals

France vs. Argentina

Serbia vs. Czech Republic

Final

Serbia vs. France

References

World Group
Davis Cup World Group